Ainsworthia is a genus of fungi in the family Chaetothyriaceae.

The genus was circumscribed by Augusto Chaves Batista and Raffaele Ciferri in Sydowia Beih. vol.3 on page 4 in 1962. 

The genus name of Ainsworthia is in honour of Geoffrey Clough Ainsworth (1905–1998), who was a British mycologist and scientific historian.

Species
As accepted by Species Fungorum;
 Ainsworthia lecythidacearum 
 Ainsworthia oblongotheca 
 Ainsworthia psidii 
 Ainsworthia roraimensis 
 Ainsworthia smilacina 
 Ainsworthia zanthoxyli 

Former species;
 A. morindae  = Phaeosaccardinula morindae, Chaetothyriaceae
 A. negeriana  = Teichosporella negeriana, Dothideomycetes family
 A. seaveriana  = Phaeosaccardinula seaveriana, Chaetothyriaceae

References

Eurotiomycetes
Eurotiomycetes genera